A M Muhammed   (born 1958), is a writer in Malayalam based in Abu Dhabi.

Literary awards 

 First Pravasi Literary Award – Govt. of Kerala (2006)
 Abu Dhabi Malayala Samajam Literary Award (2005)
 Pravasi Malayalee Development Society Thakazhi Memorial Literary Award (2006)
 Kerala Pravasi Malayali Returning Associations Literary Award
 Arabia Aksharashree Award

Major works

Novels
 Sahara (2008)
 Nizhal Nilangal (2003)
 Marubhoomiyile Pakshi (2000)
 Kanyakashmir (2010)

Short story collections
 Vellimeghangalil Oru Thooval Kozhiyunnu (2003)
 Thakazhiyile Vellappokkathil Ozhuki Ozhuki Oru Manassu (2004)
 Ramanaliyar (2009)

Essay collections
 Nermugham (2008)

References

1958 births
Living people
Malayalam-language writers
Indian expatriates in the United Arab Emirates